The Redwater Raid is a novel written by the English author Michael de Larrabeiti and published in 1972 in the United Kingdom by Coronet Books under the penname of "Nathan Lestrange".

1972 British novels
Western (genre) novels
Novels by Michael de Larrabeiti
British Western novels
Works published under a pseudonym
Coronet Books books